Anthamatten is a surname. Notable people with the surname include:

 Martin Anthamatten (born 1984), Swiss ski mountaineer and mountain runner
  (born 1983), Swiss mountain climber and mountain guide
 Sophie Anthamatten (born 1991), Swiss ice hockey player